The Government of the Commonwealth of Pennsylvania is the governmental structure of the Commonwealth of Pennsylvania as established by the Pennsylvania Constitution. It is composed of three branches: executive, legislative and judicial. The capital of the Commonwealth is Harrisburg.

Executive branch
The elected officers are:

{{Gallery
|File:Governor Shapiro.jpg|Josh Shapiro (D)  Governor
|File:AustinDavis.jpg|Austin Davis (D)  Lieutenant Governor
|File:3x4.svg|Michelle Henry (R)  Acting Attorney General
|File:3x4.svg|Timothy DeFoor (R)  Auditor General|File:Stacy Garrity US Army.jpg|Stacy Garrity (R)  State Treasurer'}}

In Pennsylvania all members of the executive branch are not on the ballot in the same year: elections for governor and lieutenant governor are held in even years when there is not a presidential election, while the other three statewide offices are elected in presidential election years.

Departments

The Governor's Cabinet comprises the directors of various Commonwealth agencies:

 Department of Community and Economic Development (DCED)
 Department of Aging
 Office of General Counsel (OGC)
 Department of Insurance 
 Department of Corrections (DOC)
 Department of Transportation (PennDOT)
 Department of State (DOS)
 Department of General Services (DGS)
 Department of Conservation and Natural Resources (DCNR)
 Emergency Management Agency (PEMA)
 Department of Health
 Department of Banking and Securities (DoBS)
 Office of the Budget
 Department of Environmental Protection (DEP)
 Pennsylvania State Police (PSP)
 Office of Inspector General (OIG)
 Department of Human Services (formally Department of Public Welfare) (DHS)
 Department of Labor & Industry (L&I)
 Department of Agriculture
 Department of Revenue
 Department of Military and Veterans Affairs (DMVA)
 Office of Administration (OA)
 Department of Education (PDE)
 Department of Drug and Alcohol Programs (DDAP)

The Pennsylvania Bulletin is the weekly gazette containing proposed, enacted and emergency rules and other notices and important documents, which are codified in the Pennsylvania Code.

Legislature

The Pennsylvania General Assembly is the bicameral state legislature composed of 253 members: the House of Representatives with 203 members, and the Senate with 50 members. The Speaker of the House of Representatives or their designated speaker pro tempore holds sessions of the House. The President of the Senate is the Lieutenant Governor, who has no vote except in the event of tie in the Senate, where the vote is 25-25. The legislature meets in the Pennsylvania State Capitol in Harrisburg. Its session laws are published in the official Laws of Pennsylvania, which are codified in the Pennsylvania Consolidated Statutes. Members of the Senate and the House cannot hold a position in any civic office, and both the houses may expel a member with two-thirds vote. Any member who is expelled for corruption may never run again for reelection in either portion of the legislature.

Judicial branch

Pennsylvania is divided into 60 judicial districts, most of which (except Philadelphia) have magisterial district judges (formerly called district justices and justices of the peace), who preside mainly over minor criminal offenses and small civil claims. Magisterial District Judges also preside over preliminary hearings in all misdemeanor and felony criminal cases. Most criminal and civil cases originate in the Courts of Common Pleas, which also serve as appellate courts to the district judges and for local agency decisions. The Superior Court hears all appeals from the Courts of Common Pleas not expressly designated to the Commonwealth Court or Supreme Court of Pennsylvania. It also has original jurisdiction to review warrants for wiretap surveillance. The Commonwealth Court is limited to appeals from final orders of certain state agencies and certain designated cases from the Courts of Common Pleas. The Supreme Court of Pennsylvania is the final appellate court. All judges in Pennsylvania are elected; the chief justice is determined by seniority.

In total, 439 judges preside over the Court of Common Pleas, 9 judges preside over the Commonwealth Court, 15 judges preside over the Superior Court, and 7 justices preside over the Supreme Court. Elected judges run in 10 year terms, at which point they are required to run in a non-partisan retention election if they wish to continue to serve.

Local government

Local government in Pennsylvania consists of five types of local governments: county, township, borough, city, and school district. All of Pennsylvania is included in one of the state's 67 counties and each county is then divided into one of the state's 2,562 municipalities. There are no independent cities or unincorporated territory within Pennsylvania. Local municipalities are either governed by statutes enacted by the Pennsylvania Legislature and administered through the Pennsylvania Code'', by a home rule charter or optional form of government adopted by the municipality with consent of the Legislature. Municipalities may enact and enforce local ordinances.

Pennsylvania enacted the Local Government Commission in 1935, by an Act of Assembly. The commission is one of the oldest in the country, composed of five members of the state Senate and House of Representatives who are appointed by the President Pro Tempore of the Senate and the Speaker of the House. The commission provides assistance to Members of the General Assembly on researching local issues.

See also
 Elections in Pennsylvania
 Law of Pennsylvania
 Politics of Pennsylvania

References

External links 

 PA.GOV
 Pennsylvania General Assembly
 Unified Judicial System of Pennsylvania
 Commonwealth of Pennsylvania recipient profile on USAspending.gov

 
Pennsylvania